Héctor Cristian Pericás Correa (born 4 May 1979) is an Argentinian naturalized Chilean former professional footballer.

Club career

Pericás had a successful spell in Chile, highlighting his period in Palestino, where he helped the team to achieve the 2008 Torneo Clausura's vice–championship.

In 2009, he signed for Unión La Calera. He left that club on 24 December 2010.

He finished his career in Gimnasia y Esgrima de Mendoza, having been loaned to Huracán Las Heras in the 2013–14 season.

Personal life
In 2007, he lost his wife, Andrea Almarcha, who suddenly died whilst he was playing with Deportes Melipilla, in the age, freshly promoted to 2007 Primera División de Chile season after winning the 2006 Primera B.

In 2013, he was arrested by the police for selling contraband cigarettes.

Honors
Gimnsia de Mendoza
 : 1997–98

Deportes Melipilla
 Primera B (1): 2006

Palestino
 Primera División de Chile (1): 2008 Clausura Runner-up

References

External links
 
 Héctor Pericás at Football-Lineups

1979 births
Living people
Footballers from Buenos Aires
Argentine footballers
Argentine expatriate footballers
Argentine emigrants to Chile
Naturalized citizens of Chile
Chilean footballers
Chilean expatriate footballers
Gimnasia y Esgrima de Mendoza footballers
Sporting Cristal footballers
Everton de Viña del Mar footballers
Unión La Calera footballers
San Marcos de Arica footballers
Deportes Melipilla footballers
Club Deportivo Palestino footballers
Cobresal footballers
Torneo Argentino B players
Primera B de Chile players
Chilean Primera División players
Argentine expatriate sportspeople in Peru
Expatriate footballers in Peru
Argentine expatriate sportspeople in Chile
Expatriate footballers in Chile
Association football midfielders